Mayianne Malin Holm Dinesen (born Marianne Dinesen on 29 April 1966 in Nykøbing Mors) is a Danish radio personality, having begun her career hosting the show Straight on DR P3 in 1992. She is perhaps better known for having dated American singer Prince.

External links

References 

Danish radio presenters
Danish women radio presenters
Living people
1996 births
People from Morsø Municipality